Gecarcinus quadratus, known as the red land crab, whitespot crab, Halloween crab, moon crab, Halloween moon crab, mouthless crab, or harlequin land crab, is a colourful land crab from the family Gecarcinidae.

Distribution
Gecarcinus quadratus is found in mangrove, sand dunes, and rainforests along the Pacific coast from Mexico south to Panama. Previously it has also been reported from the Pacific coast of northwestern South America, but in 2014 this population was recognized as a separate species, G. nobili.

The taxonomy in relation to the Atlantic G. lateralis is disputed, with many considering G. quadratus and G. lateralis to be conspecific.

Description

It has a pair of largely purple claws, red-orange legs, and an almost entirely black carapace with a pair of yellow, orange, or reddish spots behind the eyes, and an additional pair of whitish spots on the central-lower carapace.

Behaviour
This nocturnal crab digs burrows—sometimes as long as —in the coastal rainforests of Mexico and Central America, and is common along the coasts of Mexico, Costa Rica, Panama, and Nicaragua. It lives in the forest at least some of its adult life, but needs to return to the ocean to breed. It is largely herbivorous, and consumes leaf litter and seedlings.

References

External links

Grapsoidea
Terrestrial crustaceans
Crustaceans described in 1853